Lygropia pogonodes is a moth in the family Crambidae. It was described by George Hampson in 1912. It is found in Burundi, Nigeria, South Africa and Tanzania.

References

Moths described in 1912
Lygropia